Brigetta LaShea Barrett (born December 24, 1990) is a former high jumper from the United States. Her biggest success is winning the silver medal at the 2012 Olympic Games in London and the gold medal at the 2013 World Championships in Moscow. She retired in 2016 at the age of 25 before coming back in 2017.

Early career
As a high schooler in 2009, Barrett won the Texas class 5A state championship in the girls high jump.

In 2011 Barrett won the national Championships and World University Games in Shenzhen, China, jumping 1.96 m, a personal best. She also participated in the Athletics World Championships in Daegu, South Korea where she qualified for the final and placed 10th with 1.93 m

2012 and 2013: Olympic and World silver medals
During the indoors season Barrett achieved 1.97 m in January. She qualified at the US Olympic trials by clearing 2.01 m, only surpassed by Chaunté Lowe. At the Olympic Games in London, however, she jumped higher than Lowe and became silver medalist, by jumping 2.03m, a new personal best. In 2016, gold medalist Anna Chicherova's 2008 drug re-test returned positive for dehydrochlormethyltestosterone (turinabol). Her 2008 bronze was rescinded, but 2012 gold was not affected. During the indoors season Barrett achieved 1.97 m in January.

Barrett earned a 2013 World Outdoor silver medal with a jump of 2.00 m. Barrett won the 2013 NCAA Indoor Championship (1.95 m). She also won the 2013 NCAA Outdoor Championship (1.95 m). Barrett was a finalist for the 2013 The Bowerman award. Earlier that year, she jumped a new World Lead and Personal Best of 2.04 m.

Injuries and retirement (2016)
Barrett, who hails from Wappingers Falls, New York, jumped  on Friday, June 6, 2014 7:00pm at Rice University Track Stadium. Struggling with injuries, she decided not to jump and to miss the World Championships in Beijing in August 2015. Coming back on the track in February 2016 where she only managed to clear 1.84 m. She decided to retire at the age of 25 and to concentrate herself on her own business. In April 2017, she went back on that decision.

Personal
Barrett graduated from Duncanville High School in Duncanville, Texas (2009). Her high jump results earned her a scholarship at the University of Arizona where she graduated cum laude in May 2013, earning a bachelor's degree in theater arts.

Achievements

References

External links
 
 
 
 
 
 
 

1990 births
Living people
American female high jumpers
Arizona Wildcats women's track and field athletes
Athletes (track and field) at the 2012 Summer Olympics
Olympic silver medalists for the United States in track and field
Medalists at the 2012 Summer Olympics
Universiade medalists in athletics (track and field)
People from Duncanville, Texas
Sportspeople from the Dallas–Fort Worth metroplex
Track and field athletes from Texas
Duncanville High School alumni
Universiade gold medalists for the United States
USA Outdoor Track and Field Championships winners
World Athletics Championships winners
Medalists at the 2011 Summer Universiade